Johann Weiß (born 14 April 1997) is a German footballer who plays as a centre-back for Union Fürstenwalde.

Career
Weiß made his professional debut for Dynamo Dresden in the round of 16 of the 2015–16 Saxony Cup on 9 October 2015, coming on as a substitute in the 90+2nd minute for Luca Dürholtz against fellow 3. Liga side Chemnitzer FC. The home match finished as a 2–1 win.

References

External links
 
 Johann Weiß at kicker.de
 

1997 births
Living people
People from Hoyerswerda
Footballers from Saxony
German footballers
Association football central defenders
Dynamo Dresden players
VfV 06 Hildesheim players
FSV Budissa Bautzen players
ZFC Meuselwitz players
FSV Union Fürstenwalde players
Regionalliga players